Philipp Heinrich Erlebach (25 July 1657 – 17 April 1714) was a German Baroque composer, a prolific writer of church music and secular music. Much of his work is lost due to a fire.

Life 
Erlebach was born in Esens, Lower Saxony, the son of Johann Philipp Erlebach, a musician at the court of Count Ulrich II of East Frisia (1605–1648), the principality where the younger Erlebach received his early musical training.

Based on his musical abilities, Erlebach was lent to the court of Prince Albrecht Anton of Schwarzburg-Rudolstadt (1641–1710), count of the larger principality of Thuringia, in 1678. In 1681, he was appointed to the post of Kapellmeister to the Thuringian Court, a position he held for 33 years, until his death, aged 56, in Rudolstadt.

Works 
Erlebach's compositions include orchestral and chamber music, operas, cantatas, masses and oratorios. He was a prolific composer, but most of his works (over 1000 compositions), which had been acquired by the court from Erlebach's widow after his death, were destroyed in 1735 during a fire in Rudolstadt. This caused Erlebach's music to be almost completely forgotten. Only 70 compositions (about 7 percent of his working output) survived, some only in manuscript form. Much of his posterity is dependent upon published editions of his works.

About 90 of his church cantatas are extant, such as Gelobet sei der Herr täglich, out of a total of more than 400. The destroyed material also included 24 masses and at least six complete cycles of cantatas for the Lutheran church year. Erlebach also composed secular vocal music and songs, included in a 1697 published collection titled Harmonische Freude musicalischer Freunde (Harmonic delight of musical friends), which contains over 75 such pieces. From the more than 120 instrumental works Erlebach is known to have produced, only 13 pieces survive.

Surviving works 
 VI Ouvertures begleitet mit … Airs nach französischer Art, a 5, 6, 1693
 Six sonatas for violin, viola da gamba and continuo, 1694
 March from Musicalia bei dem Actu homagiali Mulhusino
 Harmonische Freude musicalischer Freunde, 1697, 1710
 vol. 1: 50 arias
 vol. 2: 25 arias
 Josephs neuer Kaiserthron, serenade from Musicalia bei dem Actu homagiali Mulhusino, 1705
 19 other arias

References

Further reading 
Bernd Baselt and Dorothea Schroeder's article in New Grove Dictionary of Music
 Bernd Baselt: Der Rudolstädter Hofkapellmeister Philipp Heinrich Erlebach, 1963
 Bernd Baselt: Die Musikaliensammlung der Schwarzburg-Rudolstädtischen Hofkapelle unter Philipp Heinrich Erlebach. Traditionen und Aufgaben der hallischen Musikwissenschaft, 1963, pp 105–134

External links 
 
 Sonatas linnrecords.com

1657 births
1714 deaths
German Baroque composers
East Frisians
18th-century classical composers
German classical composers
German male classical composers
18th-century German composers
18th-century German male musicians